Yarwil AS is a joint venture between Yara International and Wilhelmsen Maritime Services. The Norwegian registered company provides systems for reduction of NOx emissions from ship engines. The technology is based on the Selective Catalytic Reduction (SCR) method using Urea as a reactant. This method can reduce NOx emissions from ships by as much as 95%.

The company was established as a reaction to the increased focus by the global community on emissions to air from the maritime industry. New IMO regulations, MEPC 58, are in place, which demand a reduction in NOx emissions from ships globally of 20% by 2011 and 80% by 2016.

There are several different technologies available for the reduction of NOx, however the Selective Catalytic Reduction method is the only known technology that can reach the 2016 target of 80%.

Yarwil was registered on 22 August 2007 and has its headquarters at Lysaker just outside Oslo in Norway.

On 21 October 2013 a press release was issued by Yara International stating they had acquired full ownership of Yarwil and that the company would become part of their NOxCare initiative as of 1 January 2014.

References

External links
Acticle about Yarwil in Emissions Worldview
Article about Yarwil by Lloyd's List
Article on NOx reduction by Bellona
NOxCare.com

Technology companies of Norway
Companies based in Bærum